Demetrius Rhaney (born June 22, 1992) is a former American football center. He was drafted by the St. Louis Rams in the seventh round of the 2014 NFL Draft. He played college football at Tennessee State, having also played at Ellsworth Community College.

Early years
A native of Fort Lauderdale, Florida, Rhaney lost his mother, Veronica Dixon to a sudden illness when he was in seventh grade. He attended Academy High School in Coral Springs, Florida, before it was shut down, and later Stranahan High School.

College career
Because his transcript from Academy was lost, he could not meet NCAA requirements to accept a scholarship offer from Alabama A&M University. Instead, he enrolled at Ellsworth CC, and later Tennessee State.

Professional career

St. Louis / Los Angeles Rams
Rhaney was selected by the St. Louis Rams in the seventh round, 250th overall, of the 2014 NFL Draft. On June 20, 2017, Rhaney was waived by the Rams.

Jacksonville Jaguars
On June 21, 2017, Rhaney was claimed off waivers by the Jacksonville Jaguars. He was released on September 1, 2017.

Washington Redskins
On November 21, 2017, Rhaney signed with the Washington Redskins.

On September 1, 2018, Rhaney was waived for final roster cuts before the start of the 2018 season. He was re-signed on December 5, 2018, but was waived six days later.

Memphis Express
In 2019, Rhaney joined the Memphis Express of the Alliance of American Football (AAF).

Hamilton Tiger-Cats
After the AAF ceased operations in April 2019, Rhaney signed with the Hamilton Tiger-Cats of the Canadian Football League on May 23, 2019.

Buffalo Bills
On August 10, 2019, Rhaney was signed by the Buffalo Bills. He was waived on August 31, 2019.

Houston Roughnecks
Rhaney was drafted in the 2020 XFL Draft by the Houston Roughnecks. He had his contract terminated when the league suspended operations on April 10, 2020.

References

External links
 Tennessee State Tigers bio

1992 births
Living people
Players of American football from Fort Lauderdale, Florida
American football offensive linemen
Ellsworth Panthers football players
Tennessee State Tigers football players
St. Louis Rams players
Los Angeles Rams players
Jacksonville Jaguars players
Washington Redskins players
Memphis Express (American football) players
Hamilton Tiger-Cats players
Buffalo Bills players
Houston Roughnecks players